Thomas Jeffrey Hemsley, CBE (12 April 192711 April 2013) was an English baritone.

Hemsley was born in Coalville, Leicestershire, and attended Ashby de la Zouch Grammar School. He took a degree in natural sciences from Brasenose College, Oxford. He moved to London and became a pupil of Lucie Manén, and also served as a Vicar Choral at St Paul's Cathedral. He made his debut in 1951 as Aeneas in Purcell's Dido and Aeneas at the Mermaid Theatre, London, alongside Kirsten Flagstad as Dido.  The pair recorded the opera for EMI the same year.  He debuted at Glyndebourne in 1953. He was principal baritone at the Aachen Opera from 1953 to 1956, the Deutsche Oper am Rhein from 1956 to 1963, and the Zürich Opera from 1962 to 1967.

In 1960, Hemsley created the role of Demetrius in Britten's A Midsummer Night's Dream with the English Opera Group at Aldeburgh.  His other work in contemporary opera included his Covent Garden debut in 1970 as Mangus in Tippett's The Knot Garden, Iain Hamilton's opera The Catiline Conspiracy in 1974 at Scottish Opera as Caesar, and the role of Rev Wringhim in Thomas Wilson's opera The Confessions of a Justified Sinner (1976).  In 1965, he was the baritone soloist in only the second UK performance (and only the fourth performance in the work's history) of Delius's Requiem, in Liverpool, with the Royal Liverpool Philharmonic Orchestra under Charles Groves.

Hemsley was a notable interpreter of German music, such as Beckmesser in Wagner's Die Meistersinger von Nürnberg.  Otto Klemperer specifically recommended Hemsley to the Bayreuth Festival for the role, which Hemsley sang there 1968 to 1970 and recording it under the baton of Rafael Kubelík.  In the latter part of his career, he taught at the Guildhall School of Music and Drama, London and also Dartington International Summer School.

Hemsley married Gwenlliam James in 1960, and the couple had 3 sons.  His widow and sons survive him.

References

Sources

Guildhall School of Music and Drama website

1927 births
2013 deaths
Commanders of the Order of the British Empire
English operatic baritones
People from Coalville
Honorary Members of the Royal Academy of Music
Academics of the Guildhall School of Music and Drama
Musicians from Leicestershire
20th-century British male  opera singers